Martinus Lengele (1615–1668) was a Dutch Golden Age painter.

He is known for portraits in the Hague, and made a few schutterstuken there. He became a member of the Confrerie Pictura in The Hague from 1656 to 1665. In 1642 his sister Anna married the painter Jacob van Loo, who like him, worked in Paris in the 1660s.

Lengele died in Paris.

References 

 

1615 births
1668 deaths
Dutch Golden Age painters
Dutch male painters